Cyclocoelidae is a family of trematodes in the order Plagiorchiida.

Genera
The genera are ordered by subfamily.
Cyclocoelinae Stossich, 1902
Circumvitellatrema Dronen, Greiner, Ialeggio & Nolan, 2009
Cyclocoelum Brandes, 1892
Psophiatrema Dronen & Kinsella, 2009
Selfcoelum Dronen, Gardner & Jiménez, 2006
Haematotrephinae Dollfus, 1948
Haematotrephus Stossich, 1902
Harrahium Witenberg, 1926
Neohaematotrephus Kanev, Radev & Fried, 2002
Uvitellina Witenberg, 1923
Wardianum Witenberg, 1923
Hyptiasminae Dollfus, 1948
Allopyge Johnston, 1913
Hyptiasmus Kossack, 1911
Morishitium Witenberg, 1928
Prohyptiasmus Witenberg, 1923
Ophthalmophaginae Harrah, 1922
Bothrigaster Dollfus, 1948
Opthalmophagus Stossich, 1902
Porphyriotrema Duggal & Toor, 1985
Promptenovum Witenberg, 1923
Spaniometra Kossack, 1911
Skrjabinocoelinae Dronen, 2007
Skrjabinocoelum Kurashvili, 1953
Szidatitreminae Dronen, 2007
Contracoelum Witenberg, 1926
Pseudoszidatitrema Dronen & Blend, 2015
Szidatitrema Yamaguti, 1971

References

Plagiorchiida
Trematode families